Nalhati Assembly constituency is an assembly constituency in Birbhum district in the Indian state of West Bengal.

Overview
As per orders of the Delimitation Commission, No. 293 Nalhati Assembly constituency is composed of the following: Nalhati I CD Block, and Kushmore I, Kushmore II and Rudranagar gram panchayats of Murarai II CD Block.

Nalhati Assembly constituency is part of No. 42 Birbhum (Lok Sabha constituency).

Election results

2021
In the 2021 elections, Rajendra Prasad Singh of Trinamool Congress defeated his nearest rival, Tapas Kumar Yadav of BJP.

2016
In the 2016 elections, Moinuddin Shams of Trinamool Congress defeated his nearest rival, Dipak Chatterjee of AIFB.

2013 by-election
The 2013 by-election was necessitated by the election of the sitting MLA Abhijit Mukherjee to the Lok Sabha from Jangipur (Lok Sabha constituency).

2011
In the 2011 elections, Abhijit Mukherjee (son of Pranab Mukherjee) of Congress defeated his nearest rival Dipak Chatterjee of AIFB.

 

.# Swing calculated on Congress+Trinamool Congress vote percentages taken together in 2006.

1977–2006
In the 2006 assembly state assembly elections, Dipak Chatterjee of Forward Bloc won the Nalhati assembly seat defeating his nearest rival Abdul Walee Mollah of Congress. Contests in most years were multi cornered but only winners and runners are being mentioned. In 2001 and 1996 Kalimuddin Shams of Forward Bloc defeated Sharif Hossain of Congress. Sattick Kumar Roy of Forward Bloc defeated Madan Mohan Mandal of BJP in 1991, Brindaban Saha of Congress in 1987 and Sachidanandan Sau of Congress in 1982. Bhabani Prasad Chattopadhyay of Forward Bloc defeated Abhoy Charan Das of Congress in 1977.

1951–1972
Golam Mohiuddin, Independent, won in 1972, 1971, 1969 and 1967. Shiromani Prasad of Congress won in 1962. In 1957 Nalhati was a joint seat. Mohammad Yeakub Hossain and Sisir Kumar Saha, both of Congress, won from Nalhati. In independent India's first election in 1951 Mohammad Yeakub Hossain of Congress won.

References

Assembly constituencies of West Bengal
Politics of Birbhum district